Schnecksville is an unincorporated community and census-designated place (CDP) in North Whitehall Township in Lehigh County, Pennsylvania. The population of Schnecksville was 2,935 at the 2010 census. 

Schnecksville is a suburb of Allentown in the Lehigh Valley metropolitan area of the United States, which had a population of 861,899 and was the 68th most populous metropolitan area in the U.S. as of the 2020 census. Its U.S. postal code (ZIP code) is 18078.

History

Schnecksville was first settled in 1756 by Adam Schneck. His log home is still standing but has been moved approximately one-half mile from its original location. In 1840, Schnecksville was laid out by Daniel Schneck. Descendants of the Schnecks still live in the town today. He and his son Moses Schneck owned a hotel and other buildings. A George Rau opened a store. There was a post office here in 1846, with Peter Gross as postmaster. In 1880, the population was 160 persons. There were two hotels, a store, twenty two dwellings, a school and a church.

Geography
Schnecksville is located in northern Lehigh County at  (40.675741, -75.616260), in the western part of North Whitehall Township.

Pennsylvania Route 309 runs through the middle of the community, leading south through Orefield  to Interstate 78 on the west side of Allentown. To the northwest PA 309 leads through Pleasant Corners  to Tamaqua. Pennsylvania Route 873 begins at PA 309 in Schnecksville and leads north through Neffs  to Slatington. The Trexler Nature Preserve, which is also home to the Trexler Environmental Center and the Lehigh Valley Zoo, is on the southwest side of Schnecksville.

To the west, water flows to Jordan Creek, while to the east water flows to Coplay Creek. Both creeks are southeast-flowing tributaries of the Lehigh River and part of the Delaware River watershed.

Lehigh Valley Zoo
Schnecksville is home to the Lehigh Valley Zoo, a  zoo that is open year round.

Crystal Spring Farm
Schnecksville is home to one of the area's top dairy farms, the Crystal Spring dairy farm. The farm has been in operation for over 100 years and has a store that sells homemade and homegrown products. A specialty of the store is homemade ice cream, which is made fresh daily.

Demographics

As of the census of 2010, there were 2,935 people, 1241 households, and 864 families residing in the CDP. The population density was 1,572.5 people per square mile (609.5/km). There were 738 housing units at an average density of 583.5/sq mi (226.1/km). The racial makeup of the CDP was 97.89% White, 0.35% African American, 0.10% Native American, 1.06% Asian, 0.50% from other races, and 0.10% from two or more races. Hispanic or Latino of any race were 1.21% of the population.

The ancestry of its residents is as follows: German (47.0%), Irish (10.0%), Italian (9.8%), English (9.2%), Welsh (7.1%), Slovak (6.1%).

There were 715 households, out of which 43.1% had children under the age of 18 living with them, 73.8% were married couples living together, 7.4% had a female householder with no husband present, and 17.2% were non-families. 14.7% of all households were made up of individuals, and 5.2% had someone living alone who was 65 years of age or older. The average household size was 2.78 and the average family size was 3.09.

In the CDP, the population was spread out, with 29.0% under the age of 18, 4.7% from 18 to 24, 28.9% from 25 to 44, 28.0% from 45 to 64, and 9.4% who were 65 years of age or older. The median age was 40 years. For every 100 females, there were 93.9 males. For every 100 females age 18 and over, there were 94.0 males. The median income for a household in the CDP was $74,808, and the median income for a family was $78,519. Males had a median income of $51,716 versus $35,714 for females. The per capita income for the CDP was $27,533. About 1.2% of families and 1.3% of the population were below the poverty line, including 1.5% of those under age 18 and none of those age 65 or over.

Public education
The community is served by the Parkland School District and Northwestern Lehigh School District. Most students in grades nine through twelve attend Parkland High School in the Parkland School District. Lehigh Career and Technical Institute, a vocational school of Lehigh Valley students, also is located in Schnecksville.

Schnecksville is home to one of three campuses of Lehigh Carbon Community College (also known LCCC, or "L-tri-C"), a public community college with approximately 9,000 full and part-time students as of 2022.

Schnecksville Community Fair
Every summer since 1981, a country fair is held in Schnecksville. In recent years, it has been held at the Schnecksville Fire Company on Pennsylvania Route 309, near the community's southern entrance. The Schnecksville Community Fair was not held in 2020 due to the COVID-19 pandemic.

References

Census-designated places in Lehigh County, Pennsylvania
Census-designated places in Pennsylvania